Mayalodu  is a 1993 Indian Telugu-language comedy film directed by S. V. Krishna Reddy. The film stars Rajendra Prasad, Soundarya  and music composed by S. V. Krishna Reddy. The film was produced by K. Achi Reddy under Manisha Films and presented by Kishore Rathi. Mayalodu was recorded as a Superhit at the box office. The film won two Nandi Awards.

Plot
Veerababu is a roadside magician along with his friend Pandu and performs on the roads to earn his living. Once while doing such a show, he comes across a cute little girl, known as Puppy. Veerababu tries to ask her details so that he can drop her back to her home. But he discovers that Puppy's uncle Appalakonda had killed her parents for property and is trying to kill her. Veerababu takes her home for safety. But unfortunately, due to an accident, Puppy loses her eyesight. Veerababu tries hard to collect the money for Puppy's treatment and saves the money with Padmanabham, who is the father of Siri, who is deeply in love with Veerababu. When Veerababu asks Padmanabham  to give back his money, he refuses and warns him to stay away from his daughter. Veerababu ties him up to his own chair and takes away his money. Noticing all this, Appalakonda kills Padmanabham so that he can take away the rest of the money and can blame the murder on Veerababu. Even Siri believes that Veerababu is the person responsible for her father's murder. Veerababu, using his magical powers funnily uses his tricks to teach Appalakonda and his henchmen a lesson. At last, Appalakonda reveals the truth to the judge and Puppy gets her eyes.

Cast

 Rajendra Prasad as Veera Babu
 Soundarya as Siri
 Kota Srinivasa Rao as Appalakonda
 Brahmanandam as Inspector
 Babu Mohan as Chanti
 Gundu Hanumantha Rao as Pandu
 Ali as Constable
 AVS as Supermarket Owner
 Padmanabham as Padmanabham
 Subbaraya Sharma as I.G.
 Jenny
 Narsing Yadav
 K. K. Sarma as Comedy Wizard
 Potti Veeraiah as Comedy Wizard
 Maganti Sudhakar as Puppy's father
 Kishore Rathi as Magician
 Vidyasagar as Tirupati
 Sri Lakshmi as Appalakonda's second wife
 Nirmalamma as Veera Babu's Bamma
 Baby Nikitha as Puppy

Soundtrack

Music composed by S. V. Krishna Reddy. The song "Chinuku Chinuku" was well received and was again reused in another Krishna Reddy film, Subhalagnam (1994). Music released on AKASH Audio Company.

Awards
Nandi Awards
Best Home Viewing Feature Film - K. Atchi Reddy
Best Child Actress - Baby Nikhita

References

External links
 

1993 films
Indian romantic comedy films
Films directed by S. V. Krishna Reddy
Films scored by S. V. Krishna Reddy
1990s Telugu-language films
1993 romantic comedy films